Daniel 'Dani' Erencia Moreno (born 7 January 1991) is a Spanish professional footballer who plays as a central defender.

External links

1991 births
Living people
Footballers from Terrassa
Spanish footballers
Association football defenders
Segunda División players
Segunda División B players
Tercera División players
Terrassa FC footballers
Girona FC players
Sporting de Gijón B players